Lundbäck is a Swedish surname. Notable people with the surname include:

Lena Carlzon-Lundbäck (born 1954), Swedish cross-country skier 
Robin Lundbäck (born 1994), Swedish singer/songwriter, stage name "Boy In Space" 
Sven-Åke Lundbäck (born 1948), Swedish cross-country skier, husband of Lena 

Swedish-language surnames